Jack McCauley is an American engineer, hardware designer, inventor, video game developer and philanthropist. As an engineer at Activision, he designed the guitars and drums for the Guitar Hero video game series and was the Chief  Engineer at Oculus VR, which was later acquired by Facebook for $2 billion. At Oculus, McCauley was chief developer of the Oculus DK1 and DK2 virtual reality headsets. Grunge.com named him "one of the greatest inventors alive today", along with Elon Musk, Kia Silverbrook, Shunpei Yamazaki, and Lowell Wood, among others.

Early life and education
The son of a United States Armed Forces officer, McCauley’s early life began in De Bilt, Netherlands. From an early age, McCauley loved taking things apart, building them into something new, exploring everything from basic spatial relationships to electronics. When he was 9, Tinkertoy named him a "Junior Tinkertoy Engineer".

In 1980, McCauley was accepted into the U.S. Navy Nuclear Power School. The Department of Defense awarded him a full scholarship to the University of California, Berkeley, College of Engineering, where he specialized in electronics and circuit theory and earned a BSc. in electrical engineering and computer science (EECS) in 1986. McCauley credits U.C. Berkeley with moving him into his career as an engineer.

Career
McCauley began his professional career at the U.S. Department of Defense. Upon graduating from Berkeley, he worked at various technology and gaming companies including Electronic Arts, Activision, Atari, Nintendo and Microsoft. He helped develop USB drivers, kernel mode drivers, arcade machines and video game related peripherals.
 
McCauley designed the guitars and drums for the Guitar Hero video game series and invented the first scrolling feature for the computer mouse. Through his development work on Guitar Hero and Oculus VR, McCauley has been a key figure in incorporating microelectricalmechanical systems (MEMS) technology into video games.

Guitar Hero
In 2005 McCauley joined RedOctane, where he served as Chief Engineer of the Guitar Hero video game franchise. He was a contributor in the acquisition of RedOctane by Activision, where he served as the Director of Research from 2005 to 2009.

McCauley designed the electronics for the Guitar Hero guitars and drum controller, which formed the basis for all subsequent Guitar Hero versions. He designed key hardware for Time Crisis II and Time Crisis III, Silent Scope, Dance Dance Revolution, Area51, EA Sports Active 2 and Grand Theft Auto.

Oculus VR
In July 2012, McCauley was recruited by Oculus VR, where he joined Palmer Luckey, Brendan Iribe, Nate Mitchell, and Michael Antonov. He served as Chief Engineer at Oculus until 2015 when the company was acquired by Facebook for $2 billion.

At Oculus, McCauley built Luckey's original prototype into a product for the company’s first Kickstarter campaign, and headed engineering while working on development of the DK1 and DK2 developer kits, both of which were completed in 120 days from concept to shipping. McCauley led production, designed the test equipment and managed production, engineering, and China-based manufacturing of the Oculus Rift, the company's virtual reality head-mounted display.

Inventions and accomplishments
McCauley worked on creating audio effects; virtual reality motion control; computer peripherals; game controllers; haptic technology; sports and medical physiology measuring devices; light gun technology; composite HID USB device for gaming; and the guitar and drum controller for the Guitar Hero franchise. He is one of the originators of the Universal Serial Bus (USB) specification. He has authored numerous research papers in the field of artificial intelligence (AI) and mathematical modeling of AI-based systems. He won the Red Dot award product design for the design of bone-conducting headphones.

Philanthropy
McCauley contributes to charities associated with the furtherance of education and science.

References

American computer scientists
American inventors
21st-century American engineers
People from Battle Creek, Michigan
Video game developers
UC Berkeley College of Engineering alumni
Living people
1959 births